Erndl is a surname. Notable people with the surname include:

 Thomas Erndl (born 1974), German politician
 Wolfgang Erndl (1921–1994), Austrian sailor

See also
 Ernle